The Fanfare du 27e Bataillon de Chasseurs Alpin is a military band unit of the French Army. The band is attached the 27e bataillon de chasseurs alpins (27th BCA) and effectively serves as the regimental band of the Chasseurs Alpins, being that it is the single and last fanfare band of the regiment as well as this combat arm of the Army.

Brief description 
The band incorporates as part of its instrumentation the Alphorn, a traditional instrument of the Alpine hill and mountain villages of Savoy, which has been able to attract the public's favor and which allows to complete the extent of its musical repertoire. The Alphorn is the ancestor of the big family of musical horns and historically has been used by sheepherders to aide in herd recall in the French Alps. In wartime, it is also has been used to signal the arrival of invading forces to the region. Today the band can be distinguished by its small size (18 musicians) as compared to the other bands of the armed forces, as well as its gender diversity, with females making up more than 30% of its ranks. Since December 2016, the band has explored creating a big band ensemble in its structure.

Performance Schedule/History
Beginning in February every year, the band begins to develop its performance schedule for various events around the country. In many cases, the participation in events mostly revolves around parades and ceremonies as there are not many military tattoo in France. On Bastille Day in 2012, the band had the honor to perform on the Champs-Élysées alongside the French Foreign Legion Music Band (MLE) during the annual military parade. This was the second time that the band has done this, with the first time being in 2005. Outside of the French Republic,  the band takes part in military tattoos around the world, mainly travelling to countries within the European Union and NATO. The band represented the French Army in the Quebec City International Festival of Military Bands in 2013.

Traditions

Marching pace 

When Chasseurs Alpins are marching with the band and horns, the marching pace is 140 steps a minute – faster than most other armed forces units, with the exception of the Italian Bersaglieri, whose pace, as well as of its bands, is 180 steps per minute in double time. This tradition has been in place ever since it was restored in 2004.

Terms 
Like the rest of the regiment, the band has a few terms which they say differently from other army bands.

not uniforme (uniform), but tenue (outfit, or dress), like in the Royale;
la fanfare instead of la musique 
sonne instead of joue   
caisse claire instead of tambour

See also 
 Chasseurs Alpins
 27e bataillon de chasseurs alpins
 Military band

External Links

Official Website

References 

French military bands
Military units and formations established in 1871
1871 establishments in France
Military units and formations of France